Shariful Islam Jinnah (born 13 March 1950) is a Bangladeshi politician and the incumbent Jatiya Sangsad member representing the Bogra-2 constituency since 2014.

Early life
Jinnah was born on 13 June 1950. He has a bachelor's in commerce degree.

Career
Jinnah was elected to Parliament from Bogra-2 as a Jatiya Party candidate in 2014. He was re-elected on 30 December 2018.

In February 2021, Anti-Corruption Commission sued Jinnah for amassing wealth illegally and concealing wealth information.

References

Living people
1950 births
10th Jatiya Sangsad members
11th Jatiya Sangsad members
Jatiya Party politicians
Place of birth missing (living people)